The Vanbrugh, often styled The Vanbrugh and Friends and previously the RTÉ Vanbrugh Quartet, is an Irish classical musical group. The resident string quartet to Raidió Teilifís Éireann, Ireland's national broadcasting service, until 2013, and collectively artists-in-residence to University College Cork, the Quartet members were also founders of the West Cork Chamber Music Festival.

Organisation and history
The group comprises Keith Pascoe on violins, Simon Aspell on viola and Christopher Marwood with cello, and they add 1-2 members for each performance.

The Vanbrugh Quartet also broadcasts frequently for BBC Radio 3 and performs regularly at London's Wigmore Hall and South Bank.

Past appearances include concerts in Berlin (Konzerthaus), Amsterdam (Concertgebouw), Hungary (Liszt Academy), Poland (Lancut Festival), Spain (Galicia Festival), Flanders Festival, Menuhin Festival, Gstaad plus numerous visits to Scandinavia where recordings were made of the complete Beethoven quartets. The quartet tours the USA on a regular basis with performances in Carnegie Hall, New York and the Kennedy Center in Washington.

Recordings
Hyperion released two Vanbrugh Quartet CDs of chamber music by Charles Villiers Stanford. The Quartet's recent recording of three of Boccherini’s cello quintets on Hyperion was featured as Editor's Choice in Gramophone Magazine.

Other recent CDs include Metronome's second CD devoted to the music of Belfast composer Piers Hellawell, a Black Box release of Ian Wilson's three quartets and a recording for Hyperion of works for quartet and soprano by John Tavener. These recordings join a discography of twenty-one releases which includes the complete Beethoven Quartets and works by Haydn, Schubert, Dvořák, Janáček, Dohnányi, E.J. Moeran, Robert Simpson, John Tavener, John McCabe, John Kinsella, Raymond Deane, Brian Boydell and Walter Beckett.

See also
 RTÉ National Symphony Orchestra
 RTÉ Concert Orchestra
 RTÉ Philharmonic Choir
 RTÉ Cór na nÓg

References

External links
Official Website

Classical music in Ireland
Vanbrugh Quartet
Musical groups from Cork (city)
String quartets